Southern and Eastern Norway Pharmaceutical Trust is a health trust owned by Southern and Eastern Norway Regional Health Authority that operates nineteen hospital pharmacies. The pharmacies are part of the Ditt Apotek chain and use Norsk Medisinaldepot as wholesaler.

The pharmacies are located at Ullevål University Hospital, Rikshospitalet, Radiumhospitalet, Lørenskog Hospital, Aker University Hospital, Asker og Bærum Hospital, Drammen Hospital, Tønsberg Hospital, Skien Hospital, Arendal Hospital, Arendal Hospital, Kristiansand Hospital, Fredrikstad Hospital, Sarpsborg Hospital, Moss Hospital, Kongsvinger Hospital, Elverum Hospital, Hamar Hospital, Gjøvik Hospital and Lillehammer Hospital.

Pharmacies of Norway
Retail companies of Norway
Health trusts of Norway
Norwegian companies established in 2002
Companies based in Oslo